Shir Ali Biglu (also Romanized as Shīr ‘Alī Bīglū; also known as Shīr ‘Alī Baklū and Shīr ‘Alī Beglū) is a village in Hakimabad Rural District, in the Central District of Zarandieh County, Markazi Province, Iran. At the 2006 census, its population was 24, in 7 families.

References 

Populated places in Zarandieh County